2 Canadian Mechanized Brigade Group (2CMBG) is a Canadian Forces brigade group that is part of 4th Canadian Division of the Canadian Army. It is currently based in CFB Petawawa. One of its three infantry battalions is under the administration of 5th Canadian Division and is stationed at CFB Gagetown in New Brunswick.

Brigade units

Two regular force units of other formations, 450 Tactical Helicopter Squadron (of 1 Wing, Royal Canadian Air Force) and 2 Field Ambulance (of the Canadian Forces Health Services Group), are collocated with 2 CMBG at CFB Petawawa and work closely with the brigade group although technically not under full command. 2 Field Ambulance is under its operational control.

See also

 Military history of Canada
 History of the Canadian Army
 Canadian Forces
 List of armouries in Canada

References

External links 

Canadian Mechanized Brigade Groups